The  Asian Baseball Championship was the fourth continental tournament held by the Baseball Federation of Asia. The tournament was held in Taipei, Taiwan for the first time. It was the third time Japan had won the tournament, having won all three Asian Championships in a row. Taiwan (2nd), South Korea (3rd) and Philippines (4th) were the other participants.

See also
 List of sporting events in Taiwan

References

Bibliography 
 

1962
1962
Asian Baseball Championship
1962 in Taiwanese sport
Sports competitions in Taipei
20th century in Taipei